The 1975–76 NCAA Division II men's ice hockey season began in November 1975 and concluded in March of the following year. This was the 12th season of second-tier college ice hockey.

Regular season

Season tournaments

Standings

See also
 1975–76 NCAA Division I men's ice hockey season
 1975–76 NCAA Division III men's ice hockey season

References

External links

 
NCAA